Terral is an agricultural town in Jefferson County, Oklahoma, United States. The population was 382 at the 2010 census, a decline of 1.01 percent from the figure of 386 in 2000.

History
Terral was founded in 1892 by John Heidelberg Dace Terral, a Texan who leased the land from a Chickasaw woman, Emily Colbert Fleetwood, He and Hugh Schoolfield platted the townsite and began selling lots in May 1892. A post office was established August 8, 1892, with Terral himself serving as the first postmaster.

The town has remained an agricultural community since its establishment. The most important crops are watermelons, cantaloupes and cotton. Cattle and hog raising are also important. Livestock are usually sold in Fort Worth, Texas,  to the south of Terral. The town began celebrating an annual Terral Watermelon Jubilee in July 1965.

Geography
Terral is located in southern Jefferson County at  (33.896235, -97.937538), along U.S. Route 81.

Highways

Demographics

As of the census of 2000, there were 386 people, 173 households, and 102 families residing in the town. There were 226 housing units at an average density of 540.6 per square mile (207.8/km2). The racial makeup of the town was 89.90% White, 2.85% Native American, 3.89% from other races, and 3.37% from two or more races. Hispanic or Latino of any race were 16.32% of the population.

There were 173 households, out of which 28.9% had children under the age of 18 living with them, 48.6% were married couples living together, 7.5% had a female householder with no husband present, and 40.5% were non-families. 38.7% of all households were made up of individuals, and 19.7% had someone living alone who was 65 years of age or older. The average household size was 2.23 and the average family size was 2.97.

In the town, the population was spread out, with 25.9% under the age of 18, 8.3% from 18 to 24, 21.2% from 25 to 44, 21.5% from 45 to 64, and 23.1% who were 65 years of age or older. The median age was 40 years. For every 100 females, there were 90.1 males. For every 100 females age 18 and over, there were 90.7 males.

The median income for a household in the town was $15,972, and the median income for a family was $21,563. Males had a median income of $20,893 versus $18,750 for females. The per capita income for the town was $9,486. About 24.5% of families and 27.7% of the population were below the poverty line, including 40.4% of those under age 18 and 26.6% of those age 65 or over.

References

Towns in Jefferson County, Oklahoma
Towns in Oklahoma
Populated places established in 1902